The 1972 Fidelity WCT Tournament – Singles was an event of the 1972 Fidelity WCT Tournament men's tennis tournament played at the Richmond Coliseum in Richmond, Virginia in the United States from February 2 through February 6, 1972. The draw consisted of 29 players. Ilie Năstase was the defending champion but did not compete in this edition. Rod Laver won the singles title, defeating Cliff Drysdale in the final, 2–6, 6–3, 7–5, 6–3.

Draw

Finals

Top half

Bottom half

References

External links
 ITF tournament edition details

Richmond WCT
Richmond WCT
Richmond WCT
Tennis in Virginia